A Night of Horror is a 1916 silent German horror film directed by Richard Oswald, Arthur Robison and starring Werner Krauss. It is the earliest known feature-length film to portray vampires, with vampire-like people appearing in the film.

Plot 
Poor Maria Lotti, serving as a clerk in a ladies' clothing store, receives a message from a New York notary that her grandfather Joseph Lotti has died. The gang of thieves, the Brothers of Darkness, also received the same message with great detail and rushed to take action. The harassment began.

Grief-stricken, the disillusioned girl falls into poverty. A hard life full of excruciating experiences began. André meets Maria one day quite by chance at the Green Tavern. Meanwhile, Maria and Andre run away. 

They had to endure many difficulties and dangers. The Brothers of Darkness gang was overrun, but they did not surrender, and after blowing up their castle, they perished. Maria and Andre took possession of the inheritance and were never separated again.

Cast
In alphabetical order:
 Emil Jannings as Banker
 Laurence Köhler
 Werner Krauss as Artist's Husband
 Hans Mierendorff as Magistrate
 Ossi Oswalda
 Lupu Pick
 Lu Synd as Artist

References

External links

1916 films
1916 horror films
Films of the German Empire
Films directed by Richard Oswald
Films directed by Arthur Robison
German silent feature films
German black-and-white films
German vampire films
Silent horror films
1910s German films